K. Prapanjan is a professional Indian Kabaddi player. He is plays for Tamil Thalaivas as a raider in Season 8 of Pro Kabaddi League.

Early life 
He was born in Sankagiri, Tamil Nadu, India.

Pro Kabaddi League
He played for U Mumba in Season 3, Telugu Titans in Season 4, Tamil Thalaivas in Season 5, Gujarat Fortunegiants in Season 6. He was bought for 55.5 lakhs by Bengal Warriors in the 2019 auction. In PKL 2021 auction for season 8, he has been bought for 71 lakhs by Tamil thalaivas.

References

Living people
Indian kabaddi players
Kabaddi players from Tamil Nadu
1993 births
Pro Kabaddi League players